State Trunk Highway 108 (often called Highway 108, STH-108 or WIS 108) is a state highway in the U.S. state of Wisconsin. It runs in west central Wisconsin from Wisconsin Highway 16 north of West Salem to Wisconsin Highway 54 and Wisconsin Highway 71 in Melrose. Highway 108 is maintained by the Wisconsin Department of Transportation.

Route description
Highway 108 begins at a junction with Highway 16 in the Town of Hamilton in La Crosse County, just north of the border of West Salem. The highway heads northeast along a brief concurrency with County Highway C, then runs east for a short distance before heading north. From here, the route passes through a rural area and climbs a winding ridge.
Past the ridge, Highway 108 continues north, intersecting two county highways and crossing Fleming Creek. It turns northeast briefly before continuing north, where it intersects with another two county highways. The highway continues east briefly where it meets County Highway C before curving to the northeast. It then crosses Davis Creek before entering Jackson County. In Jackson County, the route passes Melrose-Mindoro High School before heading north through the Town of Melrose. Highway 108 meets Highway 71 in the town, and the two highways continue northward together. The highways cross the Black River and continue north into the village of Melrose. Both highways terminate at a junction with Highway 54 in southern Melrose.

Major intersections

See also

References

External links

108
Transportation in La Crosse County, Wisconsin
Transportation in Jackson County, Wisconsin